During the 1992–93 English football season, Aston Villa competed in the inaugural season of the Premier League.

Aston Villa spent most of the season challenging for the title, and were top of the Premier League with six games left to play, but were eventually overhauled by manager Ron Atkinson's old club Manchester United.

Story of the Season

August
Villa began their season against the last champions of the old 2nd Division, Ipswich Town in front of a packed crowd at Portman Road and came away with a point after a late goal by Dalian Atkinson cancelled out Gavin Johnson's first half opener. The following Wednesday night, and Villa were back in front of a home crowd at Villa Park to face the reigning Division 1 champions Leeds United and picked up another point with another Atkinson goal. Next, Villa faced Ian Branfoot's Southampton and it was three from three for Atkinson, and three draws from three for Villa. Another mid-week game, this time at Goodison Park brought Villa's first loss of the season, as a late Mo Johnston strike gave Everton all three points. Then on to Bramall Lane and Villa's first win of the season as two goals from Garry Parker and a first clean sheet of the season for Nigel Spink lifted Villa to 15th at the end of the month.

September
A Poor performance and a home loss to Chelsea was quickly forgotten after Villa hit three with no reply against Crystal Palace. There were comings and goings, Frank McAcvennie's short stay at the club ended and he departed on a free. To replace him, Villa spent a club record £2.3m to sign Liverpool's star striker Dean Saunders. Saunders would not be in place in time as Villa faced Leeds for the second time in a month, with the outcome the same, a 1-1 draw. He would make his debut at home to old club Liverpool, and couldn't have hoped for a better debut, hitting a brace as Villa ran out 4-2 winners. The Manor Ground next in the Coca-Cola Cup 2nd round, 1st leg against second tier Oxford United. Centre-backs Paul McGrath and Shaun Teale grabbed a goal each. Joey Beauchamp pulled one back for Oxford to make it a less straight-forward tie at Villa Park a fortnight later. Next, Villa were in the north east taking on new boys Middlesbrough at Ayresome Park. Saunders made it four in two league games as Villa ran out 3-2 victors.

October
Dean Saunders fine start to life at Villa continued with a third consecutive league brace away at Wimbledon, but the game would be remembered for the brilliant solo run and chipped finish that would see Dalian Atkinson scoop the Goal of the Season, Villa taking the spoils in a 3-2 win. Oxford United came to Villa Park for the second leg in the Coca-Cola Cup and goals from Dalian Atkinson and skipper Kevin Richardson were enough to see Villa progress, 2-1 on the night, 4-2 on aggregate. A dour goalless draw at home to Blackburn Rovers saw Villa fourth in the table, 6 points off shock early runners Norwich City, and there was another single point taken at Boundary Park, Dalian Atkinson's goal sharing the spoils with Oldham Athletic after an early goal by Villa old boy Ian Olney. The Third Round of the League Cup next and Villa playing host to Alex Ferguson's Manchester United. Dean Saunders goal was the difference as Villa progressed to Round 4.

November
Villa started November against Queens Park Rangers at home, winning 2-0 thanks to a goal a piece for Villa's two forwards, Atkinson and Saunders. 7 league goals each, Villa remained Fourth, 3 points off new leaders Blackburn. Villa faced Manchester United at home again, this time in the league, with the outcome the same, a 1-0 victory for Villa. A third straight clean sheet for Nigel Spink at White Hart Lane but his opposite number Erik Thorstvedt had a equally good day at the office, 0-0 against Spurs. Next was the visit of high flying Norwich City, and goals from Ray Houghton and Garry Parker could not stop Villa falling to a first home loss since Chelsea at the start of September, goals for Phillips, Beckford and Sutch winning the points to the Canaries.

December
Ipswich Town at home in Round 4 of the League Cup and Atkinson and Saunders each getting a goal and an assist. A brace from Ipswich forward Chris Kiwomya left the tie at 2-2. A Replay at Portman Road would be needed. Two goals from Dalian Atkinson at Hillsborough saw Villa back to winning ways at Sheffield Wednesday. And another 2-1 win at home to Brian Clough's strugglers Nottingham Forest saw Villa up to Second. The Replay at Portman Road and a solitary Chris Kiwomya strike saw Ipswich through 1-0 and Villa out at the last 16. Back in the league, Villa faltered with a 1-1 draw at Maine Road against Manchester City followed by a 3-0 humbling against Coventry City on Boxing Day, Micky Quinn terrorising Villa's normally resilient defence. Villa ended the year in winning ways, a Dean Saunders penalty enough to see them take the points at home to Arsenal.

January
Backup Goalkeeper Les Sealey was allowed a free transfer and would return to old club Manchester United. The Third Round of this seasons FA Cup drew Villa at home to Malcolm Allison's Bristol Rovers. Young full back Neil Cox gave Villa a first half lead, but Rovers equalled the tie through Marcus Browning. A replay at Twerton Park to decide Villa's fate. Villa headed to Anfield next and Dean Saunders made it 3 in 2 against his former employers as Liverpool were beat 2-1. Villa turned on the style in a thrilling Sunday afternoon encounter against Middlesbrough, goals from Parker, McGrath, Yorke, Saunders and Teale as Villa won 5-1. Back to the FA Cup and Villa hit three against Bristol Rovers to advance to the next round. They wouldn't have to wait long for that match as 3 days later, Villa faced Wimbledon at home in Round 4. Dwight Yorke's strike after 3 minutes cancelled out by Gary Elkins meant a replay at Selhurst Park. Villa made it four league wins on the bounce, sweeping Dave Bassett's Sheffield United aside with a convincing 3-1 win, but ended the month with a poor performance at the Dell, as Southampton ran out 2-0 victors.

February
A cold night in South London and a 0-0 draw in Villa's replay at Wimbledon. After 120 minutes and nothing to separate the sides, a shootout was needed. A penalty masterclass from all but one. Villa captain Kevin Richardson missing the decisive kick and Villa were out. Back to Villa Park in the league and a 2-0 win against Ipswich Town saw Villa keeping pace with leaders Manchester United, just a point separating the two. A Bobby Bowry goal made it three losses out of four on the road in the league however, Crystal Palace 1-0 winners. Villa would be back in London three days later. A 1-0 win at Chelsea, Houghton with the lone goal. Everton at home next and goals for two of Villa's right backs, Neil Cox, and Earl Barrett, a makeshift central midfielder for the day, Villa the victors 2-1. Dwight Yorke was struggling to replicate his top scoring form from last season but did get his 5th of the campaign against Wimbledon in a 1-0 win.

March
Villa would open March with back-to-back draws. First, Tottenham Hotspur came to Villa Park but the game was ultimately a tame goalless tie. Next, Villa headed to Ron Atkinson's old stomping ground Old Trafford, and a thrilling encounter between the Premier League's top two sides. United's Welsh powerhouse Mark Hughes equalised - but that was only after a wonderful long range strike from Villa's Irish left-back Steve Staunton, who opened with the goal three minutes before. Nothing to separate the two sides. Back to Villa Park, and a brace for Dwight Yorke gave Villa the points at home to Trevor Francis's Sheffield Wednesday, but Villa would end the month with a loss on the road to Norwich City, defender John Polston with the only goal of the game.

April
A goal from Paul McGrath gave Villa the points at the City Ground in a well-fought 1-0 win, but Villa failed to find a way through Coventry at Villa Park, drawing the tie 0-0. Tony Daley hit the winner at Highbury against Arsenal, and Villa headed into the final four games of the season still just a point off Manchester United. A 3-1 win at home to Manchester City kept United looking over their shoulder, and Villa headed to Ewood Park in high spirits. However, Blackburn hit Villa for three, and United beat Palace, leaving a 4 point gap, with 6 to play for.

May
Relegation placed Oldham came to Villa Park at the start of May, and Villa were expected to win extending the challenge back to Manchester United, who were to face Blackburn on the Monday night. However, Oldham were in a fight of their own, and a goal from midfielder Nick Henry gave Oldham the 1-0 win, taking their survival battle to the final day and crowning United the inaugural Premier League Champions. Villa would round off the season at Loftus Road, losing 2-1 to Queens Park Rangers. Aston Villa would finish the season in 2nd place, 10 points off United, but qualification for next seasons UEFA Cup assured.

Kit
English apparel manufacturer Umbro remained Aston Villa's kit sponsors, and introduced a new kit for the season, featuring a blue circle around a lace-up collar. The club retained the previous season's away and third kits. A new crest, featuring a yellow lion rampant on a blue and maroon striped design, was introduced, although the away and third kits retained the old club crest.
Mita Copiers remained the kit sponsors.

Squad Changes

Transfers out

Transfers in

Results

Premier League

FA Cup

League Cup

Squad information

Other Players
The following players appeared this season for the reserves, and/or did not make a matchday squad for the first team in any competitive match.

Reserves & Academy

On Loan

Trialists

Statistics
<div style="font-size:80%;">
{| class="wikitable sortable alternance" style="width:100%"
|-
! rowspan="2" style="text-align:left;width:100px" |Player
! rowspan="2" style="width:5px" |Pos
! colspan="6" |Premier League
! colspan="6" |FA Cup
! colspan="6" |EFL Cup
! colspan="6" |Total
|- style="text-align:center"
! width="5" |Sqd
! width="5" |App
! width="5" |Gls
! width="5" |Ast
! width="5" |Yel
! width="5" |Red
! width="5" |Sqd
! width="5" |App
! width="5" |Gls
! width="5" |Ast
! width="5" |Yel
! width="5" |Red
! width="5" |Sqd
! width="5" |App
! width="5" |Gls
! width="5" |Ast
! width="5" |Yel
! width="5" |Red
! width="5" |Sqd
! width="5" |App
! width="5" |Gls
! width="5" |Ast
! width="5" |Yel
! width="5" |Red
|-
|  ||GK|| 40 || 25 || - || - || - || - || 3 || 3 || - || - || - || - || 5 || 5 || - || - || - || - || 48 || 33 || - || - || - || - 
|-
|  ||GK|| 29 || 17 || - || - || - || - || 1 || 1 || - || - || - || - || - || - || - || - || - || - || 30 || 18 || - || - || - || -
|-
|  ||GK|| 10 || - || - || - || - || - || - || - || - || - || - || 1 || - || - || - || - || - || - || 11 || - || - || - || - || -
|-
|  ||GK|| 5 || - || - || - || - || - || - || - || - || - || - || - || - || - || - || - || - || - || 5 || - || - || - || - || - 
|-
|  ||RB|| 42 || 42 || 1 || - || - || - || 4 || 4 || - || - || - || - || 5 || 5 || - || - || - || - || 51 || 51 || 1 || - || - || - 
|-
|  ||LB|| 42 || 42 || 2 || - || 2 || - || 4 || 4 || - || 1 || - || - || 5 || 5 || - || - || - || - || 51 || 51 || 2 || 1 || - || - 
|-
|  ||CB|| 42 || 42 || 4 || - || - || - || 4 || 4 || - || - || - || - || 4 || 4 || 1 || - || - || - || 50 || 50 || 5 || - || - || - 
|-
|  ||CB|| 39 || 39 || 1 || - || 7 || - || 4 || 4 || - || - || - || - || 4 || 4 || 1 || - || - || - || 47 || 47 || 2 || - || 7 || - 
|-
|  ||RB|| 23 || 15 || 1 || - || 1 || - || 4 || 3 || 1 || 1 || - || - || 2 || 2 || - || - || - || - || 29 || 20 || 2 || 1 || 1 || - 
|-
|  ||LB|| 20 || 14 || - || 1 || - || - || - || - || - || - || - || - || 2 || 1 || - || - || - || - || 22 || 15 || - || 1 || - || - 
|-
|  ||CB|| 10 || 4 || - || - || - || - || - || - || - || - || - || - || 1 || 1 || - || - || - || - || 11 || 5 || - || - || - || -
|-
| ||RB|| 2 || - || - || - || - || - || - || - || - || - || - || - || 1 || 1 || - || - || - || - || 3 || 1 || - || - || - || - 
|-
|  ||CM|| 42 || 42 || 2 || - || 3 || - || 4 || 4 || - || - || - || - || 5 || 5 || 1 || 2 || - || - || 51 || 51 || 3 || 2 || 3 || - 
|-
|  ||RM|| 39 || 39 || 3 || 2 || 1 || - || 2 || 2 || 1 || 1 || - || - || 5 || 5 || - || - || - || - || 46 || 46 || 4 || 3 || 1 || - 
|-
|  ||CM|| 37 || 37 || 9 || 1 || - || - || 4 || 4 || - || - || - || - || 5 || 5 || - || - || - || - || 46 || 46 || 9 || 1 || - || - 
|-
|  ||CM|| 9 || 7 || - || - || - || - || 2 || - || - || - || - || - || - || - || - || - || - || - || 11 || 7 || - || - || - || - 
|-
|  ||AM|| 5 || 3 || - || - || - || - || - || - || - || - || - || - || 1 || 1 || - || - || - || - || 6 || 4 || - || - || - || - 
|-
|  ||CM|| 2 || 2 || - || - || - || - || - || - || - || - || - || - || 1 || - || - || - || - || - || 3 || 2 || - || - || - || - 
|-
|  ||CM|| 2 || 1 || - || - || - || - || - || - || - || - || - || - || - || - || - || - || - || - || 2 || 1 || - || - || - || - 
|-
|  ||CF|| 35 || 35 || 13 || - || 2 || - || 4 || 4 || 2 || - || - || - || 5 || 5 || 2 || 1 || - || - || 44 || 44 || 17 || 4 || 2 || - 
|-
|  ||CF|| 34 || 27 || 6 || - || - || - || 4 || 4 || 1 || 2 || - || - ||  || || || ||  || || || || 2 || || || 
|-
|  ||CF|| 28 || 28 || 11 || 1 || 1 || - || - || - || - || - || - || - || 4 || 4 || 2 || 1 || - || - || 32 || 32 || 13 || 3 || 1 || - 
|-
|  ||LW|| 17 || 17 || 1 || 1 || - || - || 4 || 3 || - || - || - || - || 2 || 1 || - || - || - || - || 23 || 21 || 1 || 1 || - || - 
|-
|  ||CF|| 16 || 13 || 1 || 3 || - || - || 2 || 2 || - || - || - || - || 3 || 2 || - || - || - || - || 21 || 17 || 1 || 3 || - || - 
|-
|  ||RW|| 13 || 13 || 2 || - || - || - || - || - || - || - || - || - || - || - || - || - || - || - || 13 || 13 || 2 || - || - || - 
|-
|  ||CF|| 4 || 3 || - || 1 || - || - || - || - || - || - || - || - || - || - || - || - || - || - || 4 || 3 || - || 1 || - || - 
|-
|  ||CF|| 1 || 1 || - || - || - || - || - || - || - || - || - || - || - || - || - || - || - || - || 1 || 1 || - || - || - || - 
|-

Notes

References

External links
Aston Villa official website
avfchistory.co.uk 1992–93 season

Aston Villa F.C. seasons
Aston Villa F.C.